This is a list of lists of galaxies.

Lists of galaxies
 List of galaxies, general list of galaxies
 Galaxies by type
 List of spiral galaxies
 List of ring galaxies
 List of polar-ring galaxies
 List of quasars
 Galaxies by association
 List of largest galaxies
 List of nearest galaxies
 Satellite galaxies of the Milky Way
 Other characteristics
 List of galaxies named after people
 List of galaxies with richest globular cluster systems

Lists of galaxy agglomerations
 List of galaxy groups and clusters
 List of galaxy superclusters
 List of filaments of galaxies

See also

 Lists of astronomical objects
 List of black holes
 Lists of clusters
 List of voids
 List of the most distant astronomical objects